I Don't Hate Las Vegas Anymore is a 1994 documentary directed by Caveh Zahedi.

Plot
The film follows Caveh Zahedi on a road trip to Las Vegas with his father and half-brother in an attempt to prove the existence of God. He suggests that if God exists, and if God is indeed omniscient, omnipotent and omnibenevolent, then all the filmmaker has to do is roll the camera and let God direct the movie.  In an attempt "to force God's hand" and change the direction of the film, Zahedi tries persuade his father and half-brother to take ecstasy with him. When they refuse, things quickly start to unravel.

Release and reception
The film won the Critics' Award at the Rotterdam Film Festival, and was distributed on home video by World Artists. The film was issued on DVD as part of a box set of Zahedi's collected works (through 2015) called Digging My Own Grave: The Films of Caveh Zahedi.

References

External links 
 Caveh Zahedi's official website

1994 films
1994 documentary films
Autobiographical documentary films
Films directed by Caveh Zahedi
1990s English-language films